Prosper Narteh Ogum (born 5 November 1977) is a Ghanaian football manager who currently serves as head coach of Ghana Premier League side Asante Kotoko and assistant coach of Ghana A' national football team. He previously coached Ghanaian team Ebusua Dwarfs. He is a Sports Psychologist and Educationist.

Education 
Ogum is a trained teacher. He is a lecturer at the University of Cape Coast Department of Health, Physical Education & Recreation (HPER). Ogum holds a CAF License A badge. He is a

Coaching career 
In 2013, Ogum masterminded the qualification of Elmina Sharks to the Ghana Division One League. He also worked with Ebusua Dwarfs in the Premier League during a short stint in 2016, he later resigned to pursue his Doctor of Philosophy programme (Ph.D). In October 2019, he was appointed as head coach of Karela United, the deal however terminated after disagreements with the management board.

WAFA 
In December 2019, he was appointed as head coach of West African Football Academy ahead of the 2019–20 Ghana Premier League season. In his first season, he led WAFA to the 10th position on the league standings before the season was truncated as a result of the COVID-19 pandemic. During his second season, the 2020–21 season, he guided WAFA to a 3rd-place finish accumulating 56 points.

Honours 
Asante Kotoko

 Ghana Premier League: 2021–22

Individual

 Ghana Premier League Coach of the month: November 2021, January 2022
 Ghana Premier League Coach of the season: 2021–22
 Ghana Football Awards Men's Coach of the Year: 2022

References

External links 

 

Living people
1977 births
Ghanaian football managers
Ghana Premier League managers
Elmina Sharks F.C. managers
West African Football Academy managers
Cape Coast Ebusua Dwarfs F.C. managers
Academic staff of the University of Cape Coast
Association football coaches